The Early Cretaceous Phu Kradung Formation is the lowest member of the Mesozoic Khorat Group which outcrops on the Khorat Plateau in Isan, Thailand. This geological formation consists of micaceous, brown to reddish-brown siltstone beds with minor brown and grey shale and sandstone beds. Occasional lime-noduled conglomerate occurs.
 
The Phu Kradung Formation sediments were deposited in a lake-dominated floodplain cut by meandering and occasionally braided river channels.

The Phu Kradung Formation is considered, on the basis of recent vertebrae fossil discoveries, to be Late Jurassic in age. However, new palynology and biostratigraphic data suggests an age of Early Cretaceous for the upper section.

Dinosaur remains have been recovered from this formation, although none have yet been referred to a specific genus.

Chalawan, an extinct genus of pholidosaurid mesoeucrocodylian, is currently known solely from its holotype, a nearly complete mandible collected in the early 1980s from a road-cut near the town of Nong Bua Lamphu in the upper part of the Phu Kradung Formation. This single specimen is the most well preserved vertebrate fossil that has been found from the formation. It contains a single species, Chalawan thailandicus.

Fossil content

Amphibians

Reptiles

Dinosaurs

Pseudosuchians

Pterosaurs

Turtles

Fish

Bony fish

Cartilaginous fish
Multiple fin spines have been found in the Phu Kradung Formation which cannot be precisely identified.

Plants

See also 
 Lists of dinosaur-bearing stratigraphic units
 List of stratigraphic units with indeterminate dinosaur fossils

References 

Geologic formations of Thailand
Lower Cretaceous Series of Asia
Cretaceous Thailand
Berriasian Stage
Sandstone formations
Mudstone formations
Paleontology in Thailand
Jurassic System of Asia
Tithonian Stage